HMCS Venture was a three-masted schooner built for the Royal Canadian Navy as a training ship in 1937. She served during the Second World War at Halifax, Nova Scotia. She was the second vessel commissioned by the Royal Canadian Navy to bear the name Venture. In 1943, the schooner was renamed Harbour Craft 190. The schooner was sold to private interests following the war and renamed Alfred & Emily before being lost by fire in 1951.

Description
The schooner had a complement of 40, including 24 trainees. The vessel was armed with two 3-pounder guns.

Construction and service
Venture was ordered in 1935 as the Royal Canadian Navy began to expand. The vessel was constructed by Meteghan Shipbuilding Ltd. Co. at Meteghan, Nova Scotia. The schooner was launched in June 1937 and was commissioned into the Royal Canadian Navy on 25 October 1937. Venture was based at Halifax, Nova Scotia as a training ship.

Venture was paid off on 1 September 1939 with war imminent. She was one of only thirteen Royal Canadian Navy ships in service at the outbreak of the Second World War. She became an accommodation vessel at Halifax for Royal Navy ratings assigned to the 3rd Battleship Squadron. In November 1941, she was recommissioned as a guard ship at Tuft's Cove, which lies at the entrance to Bedford Basin.

Venture served as such until 13 May 1943, when she lost her name to the former yacht Seaborn. The schooner was renamed Harbour Craft 190 and remained as such until sold on 10 December 1945 to a Halifax firm. Upon being sold she was renamed Alfred & Emily and initially served as a sealing vessel. The vessel eventually became a coal carrier, which she served as until she was lost in an explosion/fire off of Bellburns, Newfoundland on 3 October 1951.

Citations

Sources

External links

 

Training ships of the Royal Canadian Navy
Schooners
Sailing ships of Canada
Transport in Digby County, Nova Scotia
Individual sailing vessels
Ships built in Nova Scotia
1937 ships
Auxiliary ships of the Royal Canadian Navy